Teulisna nigricauda is a moth in the family Erebidae. It was described by Jeremy Daniel Holloway in 1982. It is found on Peninsular Malaysia and Borneo. The habitat consists of lower montane forests.

References

Moths described in 1982
nigricauda